The Morane-Saulnier AS was a high-wing monoplane single-seat touring aircraft built in France after WWI.

Specifications (variant specified)

References

Further reading

1920s French civil aircraft
AS
Parasol-wing aircraft
Single-engined tractor aircraft
Aircraft first flown in 1920
Rotary-engined aircraft